Arthur "Art" Williams Jr. is an American-born artist and former counterfeiter, who counterfeited the 1996 hundred dollar bill, and was subject of the book The Art of Making Money by Jason Kersten. His notoriety came as being the first to break all the security features within the 1996-issued $100 bill. Williams would serve twelve years in various prisons throughout his life.

Biography

Early life 
Williams was born in 1972. His family was constantly moving around the country before his fraudster father abandoned them in Illinois when Williams was 11. The family then relocated to a housing project in Bridgeport, Chicago. Williams was taught how to counterfeit at the age of 15. As a teenager, he had a child, Art Williams III.

Counterfeiting 
In 1996, the U.S. Treasury had made a focused effort to stop counterfeiting by releasing new bills. The first to be released was the $100 note, which Williams studied extensively in order to counterfeit.

In February 2001, Williams was caught with $60,000 in fake currency at the House of Blues with his wife's sister. He was released due to an illegal search and seizure. He was later arrested again in 2002 for producing counterfeit money. This resulted in a three-year prison sentence.

Williams was arrested in August 2006 after authorities searched his apartment and found counterfeit bills and tools to make counterfeit bills.

References 

American counterfeiters
Living people
Year of birth missing (living people)
American prisoners and detainees
Prisoners and detainees of the United States federal government